The 2007–08 ISU Grand Prix of Figure Skating was a series of international invitational competitions in the first half of the 2007–08 season. Skaters competed in the disciplines of men's singles, ladies singles, pairs, and ice dancing over six events. Skaters earned a certain number of points per placement and the top six scoring skaters or teams at the end of the series qualified for the 2007–08 Grand Prix of Figure Skating Final, held in Turin, Italy.

The Grand Prix series set the stage for the 2008 European Figure Skating Championships, the 2008 Four Continents Figure Skating Championships, the 2008 World Junior Figure Skating Championships, and the 2008 World Figure Skating Championships, as well as each country's national championships. The Grand Prix series began on October 25, 2007 and ended on December 16, 2007.

The Grand Prix is organized by the International Skating Union. Skaters compete for prize money and for a chance to compete in the Grand Prix Final. The corresponding series for Junior-level skaters was the 2007–08 ISU Junior Grand Prix.

Qualifying
Skaters who reached the age of 14 by July 1, 2007 were eligible to compete on the senior Grand Prix circuit. The top six skaters/teams from the 2007 World Figure Skating Championships were seeded and were guaranteed two events. Skaters/teams who placed 7th through 12th were also given two events, though they were not considered seeded.

Skaters who medaled at the 2006–07 Junior Grand Prix Final or the 2007 World Junior Championships were guaranteed one event. Medaling at both guaranteed only one invitation.

The host country was allowed to send three skaters/teams of its choosing in each discipline. The remaining spots were filled from the top 75 skaters/teams in the 2006–07 Season's Best list. The International Skating Union published the list of invitations on June 8, 2007.

Schedule
The series was composed of six events leading to the Grand Prix Final.

Medal summary

Points
After the final event, the NHK Trophy, the six skaters/teams with the most points advanced to the Grand Prix Final. The point system was as follows:

If a pairs team competed in more than two events, the teams who scored below them in their non-scoring competition did not automatically move up in gaining points. For example, if Team A placed second below Team B, and it was Team B's non-scoring event, Team A still earned 13 points, not 15.

Skaters were required to compete in two events in order to qualify for the Final.

Final points
Skaters in bold qualified for the Grand Prix Final.

Prize money
The total prize money is $180,000 per individual event and $272,000 for the Final. All amounts are in U.S. dollars. Pairs and dance teams split the money. The breakdown is as follows:

References

External links

Isu Grand Prix Of Figure Skating, 2007-08
ISU Grand Prix of Figure Skating